The Kaatz Icehouse was a historic ice cutting facility located on the shore of Kaatz Pond, off Whitney Road in Trumbull, Connecticut.  Built in 1908, it served in this role until 1955, and was believed to be one of the last surviving structures of this type in the state.  It was listed on the National Register of Historic Places in 1977.  Following its demolition in 1978, it was delisted in 2009.

It was a wood-framed structure, built in 1908 by Ernest Kaatz, who ran an ice harvesting operation between 1908 and 1955. The building was added to the National Register of Historic Places on September 19, 1977. It was razed in 1978 due to deterioration.  The local historical society claims it was the last icehouse standing in New England.

Gallery

See also
Thompson Icehouse in Maine
National Register of Historic Places listings in Fairfield County, Connecticut

References

External links

Commercial buildings on the National Register of Historic Places in Connecticut
Historic American Engineering Record in Connecticut
Infrastructure completed in 1908
National Register of Historic Places in Fairfield County, Connecticut
Warehouses in the United States
Buildings and structures in Trumbull, Connecticut
Ice trade
1908 establishments in Connecticut
Demolished buildings and structures in Connecticut
Buildings and structures demolished in 1978
Former National Register of Historic Places in Connecticut